Optimist is a bi-monthly LGBT magazine published in Belgrade, Serbia. The magazine was founded in 2011 with the goal of informing and strengthening the LGBT community in Serbia through information, but also to contribute to reduction of homophobia and social distance toward LGBT population.

Publishing 
The magazine is published every other month and is distributed free of charge throughout Serbia in LGBT clubs and bars, cultural centers, institution and organizations. It is available in its entirety on the magazine's website in PDF format.

Founder and Editor in chief is Predrag Azdejkovic, Serbian journalist and LGBT rights activist.

In September 2015 first issue of Optimist magazine was published in Montenegro, but after three issues was discontinued.

References

External links
Official Site
Facebook page

Magazines established in 2011
Magazines published in Serbia
Serbian-language magazines
LGBT-related websites
LGBT-related magazines
Bi-monthly magazines published in Serbia